Iryna Oleksandrivna Novozhylova (born 7 January 1986 in Shostka, Sumy) is a Ukrainian hammer thrower. She competed at the 2008 Olympic Games and 2012 Olympic Games without reaching the final. Her personal best throw is 74.10 metres, achieved in May 2012 in Kyiv.

Competition record

References

1986 births
Living people
People from Shostka
Ukrainian female hammer throwers
Athletes (track and field) at the 2008 Summer Olympics
Athletes (track and field) at the 2012 Summer Olympics
Athletes (track and field) at the 2016 Summer Olympics
Olympic athletes of Ukraine
World Athletics Championships athletes for Ukraine
Competitors at the 2013 Summer Universiade
Athletes (track and field) at the 2020 Summer Olympics
Sportspeople from Sumy Oblast
21st-century Ukrainian women